The Twilight Zone is the second of three revivals of Rod Serling's original 1959–64 television series. It aired for one season on the UPN network, with actor Forest Whitaker assuming Serling's role as narrator and on-screen host. It premiered on September 18, 2002, and aired its final episode on May 21, 2003.

Series history
Broadcast in an hour format with two half-hour stories, it was canceled after one season. Reruns continue to air in syndication and have aired on MyNetworkTV since summer 2008. The opening theme music was provided by Jonathan Davis (singer of the band Korn).

The series tended to address contemporary issues head-on; e.g. terrorism, racism, gender roles, sexuality, and stalking. Noteworthy episodes featured Jason Alexander as Death wanting to retire from harvesting souls, Lou Diamond Phillips as a swimming pool cleaner being shot repeatedly in his dreams, Susanna Thompson as a woman whose stated wish results in an "upgrading" of her family, Usher as a police officer being bothered by telephone calls from beyond the grave, Brian Austin Green as a businessman who encounters items from his past that somehow reappear, Jeffrey Combs as a hypochondriac whose diseases become reality, and Katherine Heigl playing a woman who went back in time on a suicide mission to kill the infant Adolf Hitler.

The series also includes remakes and updates of stories presented in the original Twilight Zone television series, including the famous "Eye of the Beholder" starring Molly Sims. One of the updates, "The Monsters Are on Maple Street", is a modernized version of the classic episode similarly called "The Monsters Are Due on Maple Street". The original show was about the paranoia surrounding a neighborhood-wide blackout. In the course of the episode, somebody suggests an alien invasion being the cause of the blackouts, and that one of the neighbors may be an alien. The anti-alien hysteria is an allegory for the anti-communist paranoia of the time, and the 2003 remake, starring Andrew McCarthy and Titus Welliver, replaces aliens with terrorists.

The show also contains "It's Still a Good Life", a sequel to the events of "It's a Good Life", an episode of the original series produced 41 years earlier. Bill Mumy returned to play the adult version of Anthony, the demonic child he had played in the original story, with Mumy's daughter, Liliana, appearing as Anthony's daughter, a more benevolent but even more powerful child. Cloris Leachman also returned as Anthony's mother. Mumy went on to serve as a screenwriter for other episodes in the revival.

Other guest stars include: Penn Badgley, Scott Bairstow, Jason Bateman, Gil Bellows, Elizabeth Berkley, Xander Berkeley, Linda Cardellini, Keith Hamilton Cobb, Rory Culkin, Reed Diamond, Shannon Elizabeth, Ethan Embry, Sean Patrick Flanery, Lukas Haas, Wood Harris, Hill Harper, Jonathan Jackson, Moira Kelly, Erik King, Wayne Knight, Wallace Langham, Method Man, Samantha Mathis, Christopher McDonald, Tangi Miller, Pat O'Brien, Adrian Pasdar, Emily Perkins, Jeremy Piven, Jaime Pressly, James Remar, Portia de Rossi, Eriq La Salle, Michael Shanks, Jeremy Sisto, Jessica Simpson, Ione Skye, Amber Tamblyn, Christopher Titus, Robin Tunney, Vincent Ventresca, Dylan Walsh, Frank Whaley, Alicia Witt, and Gordon Michael Woolvett. McDonald, Langham, Xander Berkeley, and Haas had all previously guest starred in the 1980s revival.

The series did not enjoy the same level of critical or ratings success as the original series or the 1980s revival, and only lasted one season.

Episodes

Home media
The complete series was released on DVD by New Line in a six disc box set on September 7, 2004. The episodes are presented in their production order, not their broadcast order.

See also
 The Twilight Zone
 The Twilight Zone (1959 TV series)
 The Twilight Zone (1985 TV series)
 The Twilight Zone (2019 TV series)

References

External links

Discussion of the episodes
Episode numbers and details

2002 American television series debuts
2003 American television series endings
2000s American science fiction television series
2000s American anthology television series
UPN original programming
The Twilight Zone
Television series by Warner Bros. Television Studios
Television series reboots
English-language television shows
Works by Ashley Miller and Zack Stentz
Television shows filmed in Vancouver
Television series created by Rod Serling
Television series by New Line Television
Science fiction anthology television series